The 2012 Boston Pizza Cup was held from February 8 to 12 at the Encana Arena in the Edgeworth Centre in Camrose, Alberta. The winning team of Kevin Koe represented Alberta at the 2012 Tim Hortons Brier in Saskatoon, Saskatchewan.

Teams

Draw Brackets

A Event

B Event

C Event

Results
All times listed in Mountain Standard Time.

Draw 1
Wednesday, February 8, 9:30am

Draw 2
Wednesday, February 8, 6:30pm

Draw 3
Thursday, February 9, 9:00am

Draw 4
Thursday, February 9, 2:00pm

Draw 5
Thursday, February 9, 6:30pm

A Qualifier Match

Draw 6
Friday, February 10, 9:00am

Draw 7
Friday, February 10, 2:00pm

Draw 8
Friday, February 10, 6:30pm

B Qualifier Match

Draw 9
Saturday, February 11, 1:00pm
C Qualifier Matches

Playoffs

A vs. B
Saturday, February 11, 6:30pm

C1 vs. C2
Saturday, February 11, 6:30pm

Semifinal
Sunday, February 12, 9:30am

Final
Sunday, February 12, 3:00pm

References

Boston Pizza Cup
Boston Pizza Cup
Boston Pizza Cup
Sport in Camrose, Alberta
Curling in Alberta